Mount Mercer is a  mountain summit located in Alberta, Canada.

Description

Mount Mercer is set within Banff National Park, three kilometers east of the Continental Divide, and is situated near the southern end of the Sundance Range which is a subset of the Canadian Rockies. Located four kilometers east of Assiniboine Pass, Mount Mercer is a remote peak which is not visible from any road. Precipitation runoff from the mountain drains into Mercer and Bryant creeks which empty to the nearby Spray Lakes Reservoir. Topographic relief is significant as the summit rises 1,130 meters (3,700 feet) above Bryant Creek Valley in less than 2 kilometers (1.24 mile).

Geology

Mount Mercer is composed of limestone which is a sedimentary rock laid down during the Precambrian to Jurassic periods. Formed in shallow seas, this sedimentary rock was pushed east and over the top of younger rock during the Laramide orogeny.

Climate

Based on the Köppen climate classification, Mount Mercer is located in a subarctic climate zone with cold, snowy winters, and mild summers. Winter temperatures can drop below −20 °C with wind chill factors below −30 °C.

Etymology

Mount Mercer is named in remembrance of Major-General Malcolm Mercer (1859–1916), a Canadian general who led the 3rd Canadian Division during the First World War before he was killed in action at Mount Sorrel in Belgium on June 2, 1916. He was the highest ranking Canadian killed in the war. The mountain's toponym was officially adopted in 1924 by the Geographical Names Board of Canada.

See also
 Geography of Alberta
 Geology of Alberta

References

External links
 Mount Mercer: weather forecast
 Parks Canada web site: Banff National Park

Two-thousanders of Alberta
Canadian Rockies
Alberta's Rockies
Mountains of Banff National Park